The Linbian River is a river in Taiwan. It flows through Pingtung County for 42 km.

Transportation
The river is accessible within walking distance South East from Linbian Station of Taiwan Railways Administration.

See also
List of rivers in Taiwan

References

Rivers of Taiwan
Landforms of Pingtung County